Katharine E. Lucke (1875–1962) was an American organist, music educator and composer.

Lucke graduated from Peabody Conservatory of Music in 1904. After completing her studies, she lived and worked in Baltimore, Maryland. She served as organist at the First Unitarian Church in Baltimore, and took a position as a faculty member of Peabody in 1919.

Lucke's papers are housed at Peabody.

Works
Lucke composed mainly songs, sacred music, chamber music and solo compositions. Selected works include:
A Song on the Wind, Mo Bron! by Katharine E Lucke (Music) and William Sharp (lyrics) (1947)
My Harp of Many Strings: Sacred Song by Louise B. Brownell (lyrics) and Katharine E. Lucke (Music) (1944)
Longing by Katharine E. Lucke (Music) and William Sharp (lyrics)
Candles
Allegretto, for organ		
Andante Cantabile for chamber ensemble

Some of Lucke's works are recorded and available on CD:
Historic Organs of Baltimore (1995)

References

1875 births
1962 deaths
19th-century classical composers
20th-century classical composers
American classical organists
American women classical composers
American classical composers
American music educators
American women music educators
American opera composers
Peabody Institute alumni
19th-century American composers
Women opera composers
Women organists
20th-century American women musicians
20th-century American composers
20th-century women composers
19th-century women composers
19th-century American women musicians